Dennis Crowley (born June 19, 1976) is an American Internet entrepreneur who co-founded the social networking sites Dodgeball and Foursquare.

Education
Crowley was born in Medway, Massachusetts to Mary Moraski Crowley and Dennis P Crowley.  He graduated from Xaverian Brothers High School in Westwood, Massachusetts in 1994.  He received a B.A. in 1998 from Syracuse University's S.I. Newhouse School of Public Communications and a M.P.S. master's degree in 2004 from New York University's Tisch School of the Arts Interactive Telecommunications Program (ITP).

Career
After graduating from Syracuse, Crowley worked as a researcher for Jupiter Communications, but lost his job during the dot-com bubble and moved home to New Hampshire for seven months. In 2000, he joined mobile app provider Vindigo as a product developer. In 2003, Crowley co-founded Dodgeball with fellow student Alex Rainert while attending New York University. Dodgeball was acquired by Google in 2005. After Google abandoned the Dodgeball project in 2007, Crowley found work at a company called Area/Code where he met Naveen Selvadurai and co-founded Foursquare in 2009. Foursquare, known for its location intelligence offerings for both enterprises and consumers, is used by more than 50 million people every month. In January 2016, after 7 years as CEO, Crowley handed the role of CEO to Jeff Glueck and became Executive Chairman of the company.

He was an adjunct professor in New York University’s Interactive Telecommunications Program.

Awards
Crowley has been named one of Fortune Magazine's "40 Under 40"  (2010 & 2011),) was featured on Vanity Fair's "New Establishment" list (2011 & 2012), and was named to the MIT Technology Review "TR35" as one of the top 35 innovators in the world under the age of 35 (2005).

In 2012, Crowley received the George Arents Award for Excellence in Social Media Innovation from Syracuse University.

Personal life
Crowley married Chelsa Lynn Skees at Buttermilk Falls Inn in Milton, N.Y. Sarah Simmons, a Universal Life Church minister, officiated. Crowley is also the Founder and Chairman of Kingston Stockade FC, a semi-professional soccer team in the Hudson Valley region of  the state of New York that competes in the 4th division of the United States soccer pyramid. In 2014 Crowley admitted to producing a fraudulent Boston Marathon bib for his wife, Chelsa Crowley, to use.  He apologized for his actions.  In a statement, Crowley admitted what he had done had "overshadowed the event for those who ran and those who ran to honor others".

Appearances
Crowley delivered the commencement speech at the Syracuse University School of Information Studies in 2011. He was a keynote speaker at the 2015 Congress of Future Science and Technology Leaders.

References

External links

 

Living people
American computer businesspeople
S.I. Newhouse School of Public Communications alumni
Tisch School of the Arts alumni
1976 births
People from Medway, Massachusetts
21st-century American businesspeople
American technology chief executives
American technology company founders
Xaverian Brothers High School alumni